Benjamin Johnson (born December 23, 1980) is an American college basketball coach who is the head coach for the Minnesota Golden Gophers men's basketball of the Big Ten Conference. He played both football and basketball for the Northwestern Wildcats and Golden Gophers before becoming an assistant coach for several major college programs.

Playing career
Johnson led DeLaSalle High School to two Minnesota state championships and was a two-time first-team all state selection in basketball.  He then played two years for the Northwestern University Wildcats before transferring home to the University of Minnesota, where he played his two final seasons for the Golden Gophers and finished with 533 points in 59 games.

Coaching career

After graduating from the University of Minnesota with a degree in sociology in 2005  Johnson worked as a graduate assistant at the University of Dayton. Following Dayton, Johnson became an assistant at the University of  where he was heavily involved in recruiting and backcourt development. Following UTPA Johnson became an assistant under Ben Jacobson at Northern Iowa. Following that he worked under Tim Miles for one season at the University of Nebraska.

Minnesota (assistant)

In 2013, Johnson returned to his alma mater to become an assistant under then-head coach Richard Pitino. At Minnesota, Johnson continued his previous success as a standout recruiter and player developer. With his strong recruiting efforts and local ties to the area, Johnson was able to recruit Minnesota Prep standouts Amir Coffey, Daniel Oturu, and Gabe Kalscheur to stay home and play for the Gophers. Johnson was also a key factor in the recruitment and development of Jordan Murphy who broke many Gopher records during his career.

Xavier (assistant)

In 2018, following 5 years at Minnesota Johnson accepted a new assistant position under Travis Steele at Xavier. While at Xavier, Johnson helped land back to back top 30 ranked recruiting classes. Those classes included high ranked prospects such as Zach Freemantle and Colby Jones. At Xavier Johnson once again was tasked with the development of backcourt players. During his time as an assistant at Xavier, the team went a combined 51–37.

Minnesota

On March 21, 2021, Johnson was announced as the new head basketball coach for the University of Minnesota Golden Gophers. Johnson will be serving as the 18th head coach in the program's history.

Head coaching record

References

1980 births
Living people
American men's basketball coaches
American men's basketball players
Basketball coaches from Minnesota
Basketball players from Minnesota
College men's basketball head coaches in the United States
Minnesota Golden Gophers men's basketball coaches
Minnesota Golden Gophers men's basketball players
Nebraska Cornhuskers men's basketball coaches
Northern Iowa Panthers men's basketball coaches
Northwestern Wildcats men's basketball players
UT Rio Grande Valley Vaqueros men's basketball coaches
Xavier Musketeers men's basketball coaches